James LoMenzo (born January 13, 1959) is an American bassist. He is currently the bass guitarist for thrash metal band Megadeth. 

LoMenzo was a member of White Lion, performing with them from 1984 to 1991. He was later the bassist for Black Label Society and Slash's Snakepit. In August 2021, LoMenzo was announced as the touring bassist for Megadeth following David Ellefson's dismissal and in June 2022 was announced as a permanent replacement. Outside music, he is known for being a contestant on the 21st season of the reality television series The Amazing Race.

Career

Early days, White Lion, Zakk Wylde, and other projects (1977–2005)
In the late 1970s, he started in a band called "Empty Sky", a rock band with hints of jazz. The band was based out of Brooklyn and was one of the biggest up-and-coming young bands. LoMenzo was the lead vocalist and bassist. The band consisted of Robert Littera at lead guitar, Julie Pontecorvo on trumpet, Marco Lagana on trombone, Frank Bonanno on tenor saxophone, Oscar Olivera on drums, Vincent Chirico on rhythm guitar and John Buccellato on electric piano. The band broke up as the members began to mature and take their separate career paths.

He played bass with Clockwork, his first original hard rock band in 1980 to 1983. He then went on to play in the band Rondinelli with Ray Gillen before joining White Lion in 1984.

He played bass with White Lion from 1984 to 1991, and then went on with White Lion drummer Greg D'Angelo to play with former Kiss guitarist Ace Frehley, and then later with Zakk Wylde's side-project Lynyrd Skynhead who evolved into Pride & Glory and released one album in 1994. Although he left the band during their 1994 tour, he returned to play on Zakk Wylde's 1996 solo album Book of Shadows. He had a brief stint in the recording studio with Ozzy Osbourne in 1994 but the sessions were not used, and Ozzmosis was re-recorded by different musicians the next year. In 1995, LoMenzo, along with Pride & Glory drummer Brian Tichy joined Slash's Snakepit as touring musicians. He was a member of David Lee Roth's band in the late 1990s and early 2000s and performed on his album Diamond Dave.

In 2004, LoMenzo rejoined Zakk Wylde in his band Black Label Society until October 2005 when he was replaced by Black Label Society's original bassist John DeServio.

Megadeth (2006–2010, 2021–present) 

From February 2006 to February 2010, LoMenzo was the bassist of thrash metal band Megadeth. The first Megadeth record he performed on was 2007's United Abominations. LoMenzo also performed on the band's next album, Endgame from 2009. In February 2010, it was announced that original Megadeth bassist Dave Ellefson replaced LoMenzo.

In August 2021, it was announced that LoMenzo had returned to Megadeth as Ellefson's replacement for the tour. Ellefson had been fired from the band three months prior in May 2021. In May 2022, Megadeth confirmed on their website that Lomenzo was again a permanent member of the band.

Other ventures (2010–2021) 
In 2010, LoMenzo played bass for Lynch Mob. He is also part of the band Hideous Sun Demons. LoMenzo played bass on the album "Get Your Rock On" by X-Drive which was released in August 2014 via Frontiers Records and produced by Led Zeppelin engineer Andy Johns. He is also featured on the Sweet & Lynch album Only to Rise (2015) featuring Michael Sweet, George Lynch, and Brian Tichy.

In October 2013, he joined John Fogerty's band.

As of June 2020, LoMenzo plays for the band Firstborne, the first project created by Chris Adler (Lamb of God, Megadeth).

Other ventures
LoMenzo is also a graphic artist and did the art work for Gilby Clarke's solo album Rubber in 1998. Also, in 1997, he did the photos in Mike Tramp's first solo album Capricorn. LoMenzo is also a member of a tribute band called HAIL!. HAIL!'s rotating cast of members include Andreas Kisser, Tim "Ripper" Owens, Paul Bostaph, David Ellefson, Mike Portnoy, Jimmy DeGrasso, and Roy Mayorga. Owens, DeGrasso, Ellefson and Kisser formed the band in late 2008. The band toured Europe in 2009, and in June 2010, HAIL! was on their second European tour with the line-up Andreas Kisser, Tim Owens, Paul Bostaph, and LoMenzo. Due to the death of previously announced Slipknot bassist Paul Gray, LoMenzo agreed on only one day's notice to fly to Portugal and play the Rock in Rio festival where HAIL! was scheduled to perform on May 30, 2010. Lomenzo also joined Lynch Mob in late July 2010, replacing Marco Mendoza. LoMenzo previously jammed with Lynch Mob drummer Brian Tichy in both Pride & Glory and Slash's Snakepit.

On August 29, 2012, LoMenzo was announced as a cast member of The Amazing Race 21 along with his partner Mark "Abba" Abbattista. They ended up in 6th place out of 11 teams and were the sixth team eliminated at Sokolniki Park in Moscow, Russia due to an unsuccessful search for Abba's stolen passport.

In October 2014, LoMenzo briefly joined former Megadeth members Nick Menza and Chris Poland for an unnamed project. Shortly after announcing this project, LoMenzo left, to be replaced by OHM bassist Robby Pagliari. Nick Menza would go on to join OHM as drummer, filling the role left by David Eagle's death.

Gear
LoMenzo is best known for his frequent use of the Warwick Buzzard bass and Warwick Stryker bass. His amplification section is dominated by Ashdown amps and cabinets. His effects pedals include Dunlop Crybaby, MXR Chorus, MXR Distortion, and Aphex Punch as well as other pedals. He has his own signature pedal, the Ashdown Lomenzo Hyperdrive.  His rig bears a strong resemblance to that of John Entwistle, who also used Ashdown amps and Buzzard basses (which he designed himself). LoMenzo's live rig can be seen here. He is an endorser of RotoSound bass strings. He is also known to play a spyder model Alembic bass guitar. He was also seen playing a Fender Marcus Miller Jazz Bass for the entirety of the 2007 Megadeth Tour of Duty. As of September 2008, LoMenzo has been seen playing a Yamaha BB Custom Shop model which has a slightly smaller body than a standard BB, two pairs of P bass pickups (one reversed), a neck pickup based on a Gibson Model One, a maple neck, and a Hipshot D-Tuner. Some Megadeth photos show LoMenzo playing Yamaha Attitude Ltd models that also have the P-bass/neck pickup and D-tuner configuration.

Discography
With Rondinelli
 Wardance (recorded c. 1985, released 1996)

With White Lion
 Pride (1987)
 Big Game (1989)
 Mane Attraction (1991)

With Pride & Glory
 Pride & Glory (1994)

With Zakk Wylde
 Book of Shadows (1996)

With Mike Tramp
 Capricorn (1998)

With David Lee Roth
 Diamond Dave (2003)

With Hideous Sun Demons
 Hideous Sun Demons (2004)

With Black Label Society
 Hangover Music Vol. VI (2004)
 Mafia (2005)

With Megadeth
United Abominations (2007)
Endgame (2009)
 Delivering The Goods (2022) (non-album single, Judas Priest cover)

With Tim "Ripper" Owens
 Play My Game (2009)

With X-Drive
 Get Your Rock On (2014)

With Sweet Lynch
 Only to Rise  (2015)
 Unified  (2017)

With Lamb of God
"Wake Up Dead" (featuring Dave Mustaine) (2022) (non-album single)

With John Fogerty
 50 Year Trip: Live at Red Rocks (2019)

References

External links
 
 

1959 births
Living people
Megadeth members
American heavy metal bass guitarists
American male bass guitarists
Musicians from Brooklyn
Musicians from New York (state)
White Lion members
Slash's Snakepit members
The Amazing Race (American TV series) contestants
20th-century American guitarists
Pride and Glory (band) members
Black Label Society members
American people of Italian descent
Blues rock musicians